Stéphane Robert was the defending champion but chose not to defend his title.

Tatsuma Ito won the title after defeating Yosuke Watanuki 3–6, 7–5, 6–3 in the final.

Seeds

Draw

Finals

Top half

Bottom half

References
Main Draw
Qualifying Draw

Kobe Challenger - Singles
2018 Singles